This is a list of rivers in Indonesia.

By island
This list is arranged by island in alphabetical order, with respective tributaries indented under each larger stream's name.

Ambon
 Sikula

Bali

Buru
Waeapo

Flores

Java

Kalimantan
 Below are the rivers in the Indonesian territory of Borneo (Kalimantan)

Papua

Seram

Sulawesi

 Tamborasi River

Sumatra

Sumba

Sumbawa

West Timor

By province

Notes and references

Sources

Rand McNally, The New International Atlas, 1993.
 GEOnet Names Server
Indonesia 1:250,000 Series T503, U.S. Army Map Service, (1954)